The Cheryokha is a river in Ostrovsky, Porkhovsky, and Pskovsky Districts, and in the city of Pskov of Pskov Oblast in Russia. It is a right tributary of the Velikaya and belongs to the basin of the Narva. The main tributary is the Keb (right).

The source of the Cheryokha is Lake Chereshno, located in a swampy area southeast of the town of Ostrov. The river flows northwest, enters Porkhovsky District, and close to the border with Pskovsky District sharply turns west. On a short stretch it makes the border between Porkhovsky and Pskovsky Districts. The last stretch of Cheryokha constitutes the border between the city of Pskov (north) and Pskovsky District (south). The Cheryokha joins the Velikaya in the southern end of the city of Pskov.

The drainage basin of the Cheryokha includes the eastearn part of Ostrovsky District, the western part of Porkhovsky District, the southwestern part of Strugo-Krasnensky District, as well as the eastern part of Pskovsky District.

The last  of the course of the river are listed in the State Water Register of Russia as navigable.

References

Rivers of Pskov Oblast